Standings and results for Group 1 of the UEFA Euro 1992 qualifying tournament.

Group 1 consisted of Albania, Czechoslovakia, France, Iceland and Spain.

Final table

Results

Goalscorers

Notes

References

General references

Attendances -

External links
UEFA website

Group 1
1990–91 in Spanish football
1990–91 in French football
Qual
1990–91 in Czechoslovak football
1991–92 in Czechoslovak football
1990–91 in Albanian football
1991–92 in Albanian football
1990 in Icelandic football
1991 in Icelandic football
1989–90 in Albanian football